General elections were held in Bosnia and Herzegovina on 2 October 2022. They decided the makeup of Bosnia and Herzegovina's Presidency as well as national, entity, and cantonal governments.

The elections for the House of Representatives were divided into two; one for the Federation of Bosnia and Herzegovina and one for Republika Srpska. In the presidential election, voters in the Federation elected Bosniak Denis Bećirović and re-elected Croat Željko Komšić, while voters in Republika Srpska elected Serb Željka Cvijanović. The Party of Democratic Action emerged as the largest party in the House of Representatives, winning 9 of the 42 seats.

Background

At the 2018 Bosnian general election, Šefik Džaferović of the Party of Democratic Action (SDA), Željko Komšić of the Democratic Front (DF) and Milorad Dodik of the Alliance of Independent Social Democrats (SNSD) were elected as the new Bosnian Presidency members, succeeding Bakir Izetbegović, Dragan Čović and Mladen Ivanić respectively. The SDA emerged as the largest party in the national House of Representatives, winning 9 of the 42 seats.

There was controversy over the election of the Croat member, as the non-nationalist candidate Željko Komšić won against the nationalist Dragan Čović (HDZ BiH) with the help of Bosniak voters, with Komšić winning first place almost exclusively in municipalities without a Croat relative majority. The result prompted protests of Croats accusing Bosniaks of out-voting and calling for the creation of their own entity or electoral constituency. In the following days, protests were held in the city of Mostar with signs "Not my president". In the days following the election, several municipalities with Croat majority declared Komšić persona non grata.

Following the 2018 election, the new Council of Ministers cabinet was confirmed by the House of Representatives after a one-year governmental formation crisis. The SNSD's Zoran Tegeltija was appointed Chairman of the Council of Ministers on 23 December 2019.

Tegeltija's Cabinet is supported by a coalition of the SNSD, the Croatian Democratic Union, the SDA, the DF and the Democratic People's Alliance. The major opposition is the coalition of the Social Democratic Party (SDP), Our Party (NS) and the People and Justice (NiP) party. The coalition of the Serb Democratic Party (SDS) and the Party of Democratic Progress (PDP) is the major opposition in Republika Srpska.

In the Bosnian municipal elections that took place in November 2020, there were significant defeats for the ruling parties SDA and SNSD. The SDA lost, among other municipalities, Centar, Novo Sarajevo and Ilidža to a social-liberal coalition to which the SDP, NS and NiP belong. The SNSD lost Banja Luka, to the liberal-conservative PDP and was also unable to assert itself against the moderately nationalist SDS in Bijeljina.

At a House of Representatives session held in January 2021, a vote of no confidence in Tegeltija took place, due to poor performance results during his term as Chairman of the Council of Ministers, but by the end of the voting, it was clear that Tegeltija was staying as Chairman of the Council of Ministers. Three months later, on 28 April, another vote of no confidence in Tegeltija took place at a House of Representatives session, but again, Tegeltija continued serving as Chairman.

Electoral system

National elections

Presidency
The three members of the Presidency are elected by plurality. In Republika Srpska voters elect the Serb representative, whilst in the Federation of Bosnia and Herzegovina voters elect the Bosniak and Croat members. Voters registered in the Federation of Bosnia and Herzegovina can vote for either the Bosniak or Croat candidate, but cannot vote in both elections.

House of Representatives
The House of Representatives, the lower chamber of the Bosnian Parliament, has 42 members who are elected at entity level according to proportional representation. Voters in the Brčko District are free to vote for the Republika Srpska or Federal constituency. The Federation sends 28 representatives to parliament, while Republika Srpska send 14 of them. Of the 28 representatives of the Federation, 21 are elected in five multi-person constituencies (number of deputies 3-6), to ensure proportionality, seven compensatory mandates according to the Sainte-Laguë procedure. Of the 14 MPs of Republika Srpska, nine are elected in the constituencies (three MPs each) and five via entity-wide equalization mandates. There is a three percent threshold at the entity level.

Elections in Republika Srpska

Presidency
There is a list of candidates, whereby the candidate who gets the most votes (usually a Serb) is elected president; there is no runoff. The first-placed candidates from the other two ethnic groups (usually a Bosniak and a Croat) are elected as vice-presidents. The term of office of the President of Republika Srpska is four years with an option for one-time re-election. A renewed candidacy is possible again after a break of at least one term of office.

National Assembly
The lower chamber of Republika Srpska, the National Assembly, is composed of 83 members elected by proportional representation. The election takes place in nine multi-person constituencies with entity-wide balancing mandates. Furthermore, at least four representatives should be represented in the National Assembly from each of the constitutive peoples. There is a three percent threshold.

Elections in the Federation of Bosnia and Herzegovina

Presidency
Unlike in Republika Srpska, the president of the Federation and the two vice-presidents are not elected by direct election: The first chamber of the Federal Parliament, the House of Peoples, nominates candidates for the presidency and the vice-presidencies, followed by the second chamber, the House of Representatives, must confirm this nomination by election. Subsequently, confirmation by the majority of the delegates of all three constitutive ethnic groups in the House of Peoples is required.

House of Representatives
The House of Representatives of the Federation of Bosnia and Herzegovina has a total of 98 members who are elected by proportional representation. The election takes place in 12 multi-person constituencies with entity-wide balancing mandates. In the Federal House of Representatives, each constitutive ethnic group should be represented by at least four members. The threshold is three percent.

Cantonal Assemblies
The assemblies of the 10 cantons of the Federation are also elected. The election is based on proportional representation with a threshold of three percent. The individual cantonal assemblies send members to the House of Peoples.

Presidency candidates

Declared candidates
The following were the official candidates who ran for Presidency member.

Bosniak member election

Croat member election

Serb member election

Declined to be candidates
The individuals in this section were the subject of speculation about their possible candidacy, but publicly denied interest in running.
Fahrudin Radončić, current president of the Union for a Better Future of BiH (2009–present)
Šefik Džaferović, former Presidency member (2018–2022)
Haris Silajdžić, founder of the Party for Bosnia and Herzegovina; former Presidency member (2006–2010); former Prime Minister of the Republic of Bosnia and Herzegovina (1993–1996)

Results

Presidency

The elected members of the national Presidency were Denis Bećirović (Bosniak, SDP BiH), Željko Komšić (Croat, DF) and Željka Cvijanović (Serb, SNSD).

House of Representatives

By entity

Allegations of voter fraud
Following the release of the preliminary results in the Republika Srpska entity elections, opposition parties filed accusations of electoral fraud directly against the leading candidate Milorad Dodik, who they claimed had coordinated stuffing ballot boxes with thousands of illegal votes to put the Alliance of Independent Social Democrats ahead in the polls and that Jelena Trivić of the Party of Democratic Progress was the true winner of the Republika Srpska presidential election. As a result of the allegations, the Central Election Commission began a recount the ballots. When the Election Commission verified the preliminary results, they did not verify the Republika Srpska elections. However on 27 October, officials confirmed Dodik's victory. The commission noted that while there were irregularities, none were on a level that would have changed the outcome of the election.

Aftermath
On 15 December 2022, a coalition led by the Alliance of Independent Social Democrats, the Croatian Democratic Union (HDZ BiH) and the Social Democratic Party reached an agreement on the formation of a new government for the 2022–2026 parliamentary term, designating Borjana Krišto (HDZ BiH) as the new Chairwoman of the Council of Ministers. The Presidency officially nominated Krišto as chairwoman-designate on 22 December. The national House of Representatives confirmed her appointment on 28 December. On 25 January 2023, the House of Representatives confirmed the appointment of Krišto's cabinet.

See also
2022 Federation of Bosnia and Herzegovina general election
2022 Republika Srpska general election

References

External links
Central Election Commission BiH, 2022 election

Bosnia
General election
Elections in Bosnia and Herzegovina
Bosnia